Dadahalou is a village in the southeastern Dikhil Region of Djibouti. It is situated approximately 25 km (15 mi) eastern of Dikhil, the regional capital.

Overview
The village inhabitants belong to various mainly Afro-Asiatic speaking ethnic groups, with the Issa Somali predominant. Most of the inhabitants earned their living through animal husbandry and commerce, and used a well for drinking water. Nearby towns and villages include Mouloud (14 km), Dikhil (25 km) and Ali Sabieh (44 km).

Climate
The warmest month of the year is July with an average temperature of 36.9 °C. In January, the average temperature is 25.3 °C. It is the lowest average temperature of the whole year and the driest month is December with 3 mm. Most precipitation falls in August, with an average of 45 mm.

References
Dadahalou
Dadahalou prayer times

Populated places in Djibouti